Kozhikode District has four types of administrative hierarchies: 
 Taluk and Village administration managed by the provincial government of Kerala
 Panchayath Administration managed by the local bodies
 Parliament Constituencies for the federal government of India
 Assembly Constituencies for the provincial government of Kerala

Legislative constituencies

 Balussery
 Beypore
 Elathur
 Koduvally
 Koyilandy
 Kozhikode North
 Kozhikode South
 Kunnamangalam
 Kuttiady
 Nadapuram
 Perambra
 Thiruvambady
 Vatakara

Villages in Kozhikode Taluk

 Kasaba
 Katchery
 Panniyankara
 Nagaram
 Feroke
 Ramanattukara
 Kadalundy
 Karuvanthuruthy
 Beypore
 Puthiyangadi
 Valayanad
 Cheruvannur
 Chevayue
 Nellicode
 Chelavoor
 Elathur
 Thalakulathur
 Vengeri
 Kakkodi
 Olavanna
 Chelannur
 Pantheerankavu
 Kunnamangalam
 Perumanna
 Peruvayal
 Kumaranellur
 Thazhecode
 Kakkur
 Nanminda
 Kakkad
 Chathamangalam
 Poolacode
 Kuruvattur
 Kodiyathur
 Mavoor
 Kuttikkattur
 Madavoor
 Kottuli
 Raroth   

 Puthiyangadi, Valayanad and Cheruvannur

 *     Chevayur, Nellicode, Chelavoor and Elathur

 Thalakulathur, Vengeri, Kakkodi and Olavanna

 *     Chelannur, Pantheerankavu and Kunnamangalam

 

 *     Kakkur, Nanminda, Kakkad and Chathamangalam

Villages in Vatakara Taluk
      Azhiyur, Onchiyam and Chorodu
      Eramala, Villiappally and Kottappally
      Ayancherry, Thiruvallur and Maniyur
      Palayad, Nadakkuthazhe and Velom
      Chekkiad, Edacherry and Thuneri
      Nadapuram, Purameri and Kunnummal
      Narippatta, Kayakkodi and Kuttiady
      Kavilumpara, Maruthomkara and Valayam
      Vanimel, Vilangad and Tinur

Villages in Koyilandy Taluk

Koyilandy is the thaluk headquarters of 34 villages. They are: Arikkulam, Atholy, Avitanallur, Balussery, Chakkittapara, Changaroth, Chemancheri, Chempanode, Chengottukavu, Cheruvannur, Eravattur, Iringal, Kayanna, Keezhariyur, Koorachundu, Koothali, Kottur, Kozhukkallur, Menhaniam, Meppayur, Moodadi, Naduvannur, Nochad, Palery, Panangad, Panthalayani, Payyoli, Perambra, Sivapuram, Thikkodi, Thurayur, Ulliyeri, Unnikulam , Viyyur and Muchukunnu.

Villages in Thamarassery Taluk

There are 20 villages in Thamarassery Taluk. They are
 
     Koodaranji, Thiruvambady and Nellippoyil
     Koduvally, Puthur and Kizhakkoth
     Narikkuni, Raroth and Kedavoor
     Kodanchery, Puduppadi and Koodathai
     Kanthalad, Vavad and Eangapuzha
     Kinaloor, Panangad and Sivapuram

Kozhikode Parliament Constituency

Assembly segments
Kozhikode Lok Sabha constituency is composed of the following assembly segments:
 Balusseri
 Koduvally
 Kozhikode North
 Kozhikode South
 Beypore
 Kunnamangalam
 Elathur

Members of Parliament
Madras
 1951: Achuthan Damodaran Menon, Kisan Mazdoor Praja Party
 1957: K.P. Kutti Krishnan Nair, Indian National Congress

Kerala
 1962: C.H. Mohammed Koya, Indian Union Muslim League
 1967: Ebrahim Sulaiman Sait, Indian Union Muslim League
 1971: Ebrahim Sulaiman Sait, Indian Union Muslim League
 1977: V.A. Seyid Muhammad, Indian National Congress
 1980: E. K. Imbichi Bava, Communist Party of India (Marxist)
 1984: K.G. Adiyodi, Indian National Congress
 1989: K. Muraleedharan, Indian National Congress
 1991: K. Muraleedharan, Indian National Congress
 1996: M.P. Veerendra Kumar, Janata Dal
 1998: P. Sankaran, Indian National Congress
 1999: K. Muraleedharan, Indian National Congress
 2004: M.P. Veerendra Kumar, Janata Dal (Secular)
 2009: M. K. Raghavan, Indian National Congress
 2014: M. K. Raghavan, Indian National Congress

Indian general election, 2014
Veteran parliamentarian A. Vijayaraghavan will be the Left Democratic Front (LDF) candidate from Kozhikode constituency in the Lok Sabha Elections 2014. Sitting MP M. K. Raghavan will contest as the United Democratic Front (UDF) candidate and C. K. Padmanabhan as the Bharatiya Janata Party (BJP) candidate.

Election results
Percentage Changes are based on numbers from the 1999 elections.

Vatakara Parliament Constituency
Vatakara (or Badagara) is a Lok Sabha constituency in Kerala.

Assembly segments
Vatakara Lok Sabha constituency is composed of the following assembly segments:
 Tellicherry
 kuthuparamba
 Vatakara
 Nadapuram
 Kuttiady
 Koyilandy
 Perambra

Members of Parliament
 1957: K.B. Menon, Praja Socialist Party
 1962: A.V. Raghavan, Independent
 1967: A. Sreedharan, Samyukta Socialist Party
 1971: K.P. Unnikrishnan, Indian National Congress
 1977: K.P. Unnikrishnan, Indian National Congress
 1980: K.P. Unnikrishnan, Indian National Congress (Urs)
 1984: K.P. Unnikrishnan, Indian Congress (Socialist)
 1989: K.P. Unnikrishnan, Indian Congress (Socialist)
 1991: K.P. Unnikrishnan, Indian Congress (Socialist)
 1996: O. Bharatan, Communist Party of India (Marxist)
 1998: A.K. Premajam, Communist Party of India (Marxist)
 1999: A.K. Premajam, Communist Party of India (Marxist)
 2004: P. Satheedevi, Communist Party of India (Marxist)
 2009: Mullappally Ramachandran, Indian National Congress
 2014: Mullappally Ramachandran, Indian National Congress

Indian general election, 2014
Mullappally Ramachandran, the incumbent, was the United Democratic Front (UDF) candidate while A N Shamseer of the CPI(M)  contested as the Left Democratic Front (LDF) candidate in the Lok Sabha Elections 2014. VK Sajeevan was the Bharatiya Janata Party (BJP) candidate and Ali Akbar was the candidate for the Aam Admi Party (AAP).

See also
 Indian general election, 2014 (Kerala)
 List of Constituencies of the Lok Sabha
 Kozhikode (Lok Sabha constituency)
 Vatakara (Lok Sabha constituency)

References

External links
 Election Commission of India

Politics of Kozhikode district